Arya is an urban locality (urban-type settlement) in Urensky District of Nizhny Novgorod Oblast, Russia. Population:

References

Notes

Sources

Urban-type settlements in Nizhny Novgorod Oblast
Urensky District